The Criminal Law Act 1827 (7 & 8 Geo IV c. 28) was an Act of the Parliament of the United Kingdom, applicable only to England and Wales. It abolished many obsolete procedural devices in English criminal law, particularly the benefit of clergy. It was repealed by the Criminal Law Act 1967.

The Act has sixteen parts. Parts I - V concerned the formalities of pleading, Parts VI - VII abolished benefit of clergy, Parts VIII - X dealt with the punishment of felonies, Part XI created offences related to fraudulent certificates of indictment, Part XII covered criminal cases handled by the Court of Admiralty, Part XIII made provision for pardons, and Parts XIV - XVI were interpretation and jurisdiction provisions.

Part I: Mode of trial

This part of the act stated:

Before this enactment, defendants who pleaded "not guilty" to a charge of felony were formally obliged to choose their mode of trial, in a standard exchange with the clerk of the court: "How wilt thou be tried?" "By God and my country." "God grant thee a good deliverance."  By this process, the prisoner elected jury trial rather than trial by ordeal: however, as trial by ordeal had been officially abolished by a statute of Henry III in 1219, the prisoner in fact had no choice to make.  Part I of the 1827 act removed the requirement for this formality.

Part II: Consequences of refusal to plead

Historically, prisoners who refused to plead to an indictment were tortured, in a process known as peine fort et dure, until they died or entered a plea.  The "Act for the More Effectual Proceedings Against Persons Standing Mute" of 1772 (12 Geo III c.20) abolished this: instead, prisoners who refused to answer the indictment were deemed to have pleaded "Guilty", and were then sentenced for the crime.  The 1827 act reversed the position; "if any Person being arraigned or charged with any Indictment or Information ... shall stand mute of Malice, or not answer directly to the Indictment or Information, in every Case it shall be lawful for the Court, if it shall so think fit, to order the proper Officer to enter a Plea of 'Not guilty' on behalf of such Person".

Parts III - V

Part III of the act limited the number of peremptory challenges to jurors that a defendant could make; after the limit was reached, any subsequent challenges were to be disregarded.  Part IV of the act restricted the plea of autrefois convict - "no Plea setting forth any Attainder shall be pleaded in bar of any Indictment unless the Attainder be for the same Offence as that charged in the Indictment."  Part V prevented the jury from making any enquiries into the assets of the prisoner on a charge of felony - if the prisoner were convicted, these assets would be confiscated.

Parts VI - VII: Benefit of clergy

Part VI stated - "And be it enacted, That benefit of clergy, with respect to persons convicted of felony, shall be abolished".  Benefit of clergy was a traditional practice which enabled many convicted felons to avoid the death penalty by reading (or memorizing) a passage from the Bible; originally, this was held to prove that the defendant was in Holy Orders, and therefore subject to the jurisdiction of the ecclesiastical courts (which did not have the power to impose capital sentences) rather than the civil courts, but, by the eighteenth century, this was disregarded - female defendants, for whom being in Holy Orders was impossible, were entitled to claim benefit of clergy by a statute of 1691 (3 Will & Mar c. 9).  Previously to the 1827 act, Parliament had responded to the perceived injustice by reducing the number of offences for which clergy could be claimed: the 1827 act abolished it altogether.  However, a statute of Edward VI also enabled peers to claim a similar benefit, and it was uncertain that this form of proceeding was covered by the words of the 1827 Act.  The abolition of the benefit for peers was abolished by an Act of 1841 (4 & 5 Vict c. 22).

Part VII of the 1827 Act preserved the relief from the death penalty that was formerly available to felons entitled to claim benefit of clergy.

Parts VIII - XI: Punishment of felons

Part VIII specified the penalties for felonies for which no punishment was explicitly prescribed: imprisonment for up to two years, together with flogging for male offenders only, or transportation for up to seven years.  Part IX allowed the imposition of hard labour as part of custodial sentences.  Part X permitted consecutive sentences to be imposed on felons.

Part XI provided for increased penalties (imprisonment for up to seven years or transportation for life) for repeat offenders, and made it a felony for any court official to produce fraudulent evidence of previous convictions.

Part XII: Admiralty cases

Part XII prescribed that "all Offences prosecuted in the High Court of Admiralty of England shall, upon every first and subsequent Conviction, be subject to the same Punishments, whether of Death or otherwise, as if such Offences had been committed upon the Land."

Part XIII: Pardons

Part XIII dealt with pardons - "no free Pardon ... shall prevent or mitigate the Punishment to which the Offender might otherwise be lawfully sentenced on a subsequent Conviction".

Parts XIV - XVI 

Part XIV of the act stated that references to males in the act included females, references to singular persons included multiple persons, and that the Act applied to legal persons as well as natural persons.  Part XV specified the date on which the Act was to come into force (1 July 1827), and Part XVI excluded Scotland and Ireland from its provisions.

See also
Criminal Law Act

References

External links
Original text of the bill, from The Statutes of the United Kingdom of Great Britain and Ireland, Volumes 67-68, page 165 (via Google Books)

United Kingdom Acts of Parliament 1827
English criminal law
Criminal law of the United Kingdom